() is a district of the city of Shuangyashan, Heilongjiang, People's Republic of China.

Administrative divisions
There are seven subdistricts and one town in the district: 

Subdistricts:
Hongqi Subdistrict, Yuejin Subdistrict, Qixing Subdistrict, Shuangyang Subdistrict, Xin'an Subdistrict, East Baowei Subdistrict, Dianchang Subdistrict

The only town is Qixing

Notes and references 

Baoshan
Shuangyashan